Crazy Bats, formerly Space Center and Temple of the Night Hawk is an enclosed roller coaster located at Phantasialand.

History 
Founded in 1988 after 18 months of construction, the ride was originally called ‘'Space Center'’. The ride led passengers past models of rockets and emulated asteroids and the darkened hall was dimly lit with thousands of tiny spots of light to resemble stars. Due to the construction of the neighbouring Wuze Town in 2001, the roller coaster was redeveloped with a fantasy jungle theme and was renamed as the Temple of the Night Hawk. The roller coaster is now completely dark. Until 2006 there were some green moving lights and strobe lights in the first lift hill, still present today, but not operational. In 2008 the Lights on the coaster trains were turned off or broke down and have never been repaired since then. 

Till 2010 there was a green laser projection with the outlines of a flying hawk and until June 2012, there were some red strobe-lights at the final brake run. In 2011, the park installed new strobe lights in the first lift hill, which broke down after about two months, and were never repaired since then. The ride has four trains and one spare train for repairs each with seven cars. Each car has two rows of seats each holding two people. During the four-minute ride time the trains are lifted by three lift hill chains,  of track. The roller coaster is therefore one of the longest indoor roller coasters in the World, slightly beaten by "Mindbender" in Galaxyland Amusement Park, Canada. In the basement of the hall is the ‘'Hollywood Tour’' dark ride. The total investment for the ride was around 15 million DM.

With the redevelopment of the ride in 2001 the park tried greening the roof of the hall by installing an irrigation system, however the results were not as good as expected. As an interim solution camouflage nets were installed on the roof, which, however, were removed after the major fire in the park and the resulting stringent fire regulations.

Until 2014 the song "The Egg Travels" from Disney's Dinosaur was played by several speakers placed inside the hall. In the station of the roller coaster, the song "Inner Sanctum/The Nesting Grounds" and the intro of the song "The End Of Our Island" from Disney's Dinosaur were played. By 2015 these songs were replaced with custom songs produced by IMAscore.

Originally, the coaster was about to be manufactured by BHS/Zierer, with linear induction motors as transport elements. After the track layout was already developed and models were created, the park finally decided to work with Vekoma and scrap the idea of linear induction motors, because of financial reasons.

References

Roller coasters in Germany
Roller coasters introduced in 1988